Empire Brutus was a  cargo ship which was built in 1941 by J. L. Thompson & Sons Ltd for the Ministry of War Transport (MoWT). Although twice damaged by enemy action, she survived the war. Postwar she was sold into merchant service, being renamed Vergmor, Southgate and Fatih, serving until scrapped in 1968.

Description
Empire Brutus was built by J. L. Thompson & Sons Ltd, Sunderland. She was yard number 624. Launched on 18 December 1942, she was completed in March 1943.

The engine was built by the Central Marine Engine Company (1938) Ltd, Newcastle upon Tyne. She had a GRT of 7,233 with a NRT of 4,294.

Career

Wartime
Empire Brutus's port of registry was Sunderland. She was operated under the management of W. T. Gould. She was on a voyage from Newport, Wales to Algiers and Bougie, Algeria laden with ammunition, bombs and trucks.

Empire Brutus was a member of Convoy MKS 43G, which departed Gibraltar on 22 March 1944 bound for the United Kingdom. and Loch Ewe on 10 September. It dispersed at sea on 15 September. She was carrying general cargo. She was beached on Juno Beach. The following day, she was refloated and towed to Middlesbrough for repairs. Empire Brutus was a member of Convoy MKS 101G, which departed Gibraltar on 15 May 1945 bound for the United Kingdom. Empire Brutus was carrying a cargo of wheat. Those killed whilst serving on Empire Brutus during World War II are commemorated at the Tower Hill Memorial, London.

Postwar
In 1948, Empire Brutus was sold to the Haddon Steamship Co Ltd, London and renamed Vergmor. In 1950, she was sold to the Turnbull, Scott Shipping Co Ltd and was renamed Southgate, serving with them for five years. In 1950, Southgate was sold to Sadikzade Rusen Ogullari KS, Turkey and renamed Fatih. She served until 1968. Fatih was scrapped at Istanbul in February 1968.

Official Numbers and Code Letters

Official Numbers were a forerunner to IMO Numbers. Empire Brutus, Vergmor and Southgate had the UK Official Number 169111. Empire Brutus used the Code Letters BFFY.

References

1942 ships
Ships built on the River Wear
Empire ships
Ministry of War Transport ships
Steamships of the United Kingdom
Maritime incidents in July 1943
Maritime incidents in July 1944
Merchant ships of the United Kingdom
Steamships of Turkey
Cargo ships of Turkey